Syntomodrillia is a genus of sea snails, marine gastropod mollusks in the family Drilliidae.

Species
Species within the genus Syntomodrillia include:
 Syntomodrillia bermudensis Fallon, 2016
 Syntomodrillia carolinae Bartsch, 1934
 † Syntomodrillia circinata Powell, 1944
 † Syntomodrillia complexa Powell, 1944
 † Syntomodrillia compta Powell, 1944
 Syntomodrillia cookei (E. A. Smith, 1888)
 Syntomodrillia curacaoensis Fallon, 2016
 † Syntomodrillia espyra Woodring 1928
 Syntomodrillia floridana Fallon, 2016
 Syntomodrillia harasewychi Fallon, 2016
 Syntomodrillia hesperia Fallon, 2016
 Syntomodrillia hypsela (R.B. Watson, 1881)
 † Syntomodrillia inadrina Mansfield 1925 
 † Syntomodrillia iphis Woodring 1928
 Syntomodrillia lissotropis (Dall, 1881)
 † Syntomodrillia ludbrookae Powell, 1944
 Syntomodrillia lyra Fallon, 2016
 Syntomodrillia mellea Fallon, 2016
 † Syntomodrillia obsoleta Powell, 1944
 Syntomodrillia peggywilliamsae Fallon, 2016
 Syntomodrillia portoricana Fallon, 2016
 Syntomodrillia pusilla Fallon, 2016
 Syntomodrillia socolatea Fallon, 2016
 Syntomodrillia stahlschmidti Fallon, 2016
 † Syntomodrillia tantula (Conrad, 1848)
 Syntomodrillia triangulos Fallon, 2016
 Syntomodrillia trinidadensis Fallon, 2016
 † Syntomodrillia venusta Powell, 1944
 Syntomodrillia vitrea McLean & Poorman, 1971
 † Syntomodrillia waiauensis Powell, 1942 
 Syntomodrillia woodringi Bartsch, 1934
 Species brought into synonymy
 Syntomodrillia cybele Pilsbry & Lowe, 1932: synonym of Cerodrillia cybele (Pilsbry & Lowe, 1932)
 Syntomodrillia simpsoni (Simpson, 1886): synonym of Lissodrillia simpsoni(Simpson, 1886)
 Syntomodrillia tantula Bartsch, 1934: synonym of Syntomodrillia portoricana Fallon, 2016
 Syntomodrillia (Hauturea) vivens Powell, 1942: synonym of Splendrillia vivens (Powell, 1942)

References

 Woodring, Wendell Phillips. Miocene mollusks from Bowden, Jamaica: pelecypods and scaphopods. The Carnegie Institution of Washington, 1928.
 Powell, Arthur William Baden. The New Zealand Recent and Fossil Mollusca of the Family Turridae: With General Notes on Turrid Nomenclature and Systematics. No. 2. Unity Press limited, printers, 1942.
 Powell, Arthur William Baden. "The Australian Tertiary Mollusca of the Family Turridae." Records of the Auckland Institute and Museum 3.1 (1944): 3-68.
 Powell, A. W. B. "Biological Primary Types in the Auckland Museum: No. 3. Zoological (supplement)." Records of the Auckland Institute and Museum 3.6 (1949): 403–409.
 Powell, A.W.B. (1966), 1966. The molluscan families Speightiidae and Turridae. Bull. Auckl. Inst. Mus. 5: 1–184, pls. 1-23.

External links
 Smith, E.A. (1888) Diagnoses of new species of Pleurotomidae in the British Museum. Annals and Magazine of Natural History, series 6, 2, 300–317
 Fallon P.J. (2016). Taxonomic review of tropical western Atlantic shallow water Drilliidae (Mollusca: Gastropoda: Conoidea) including descriptions of 100 new species. Zootaxa. 4090(1): 1-363

 
Gastropod genera